José Tadormina Garrido was a Chilean football manager who developed his career in Peru.

Career
Tadormina is one of the first Chilean managers to work in the Peruvian top division, the second after Hugo Tassara. He also coached Coronel Bolognesi before the club joined the professional categories.

In the 1973 Torneo Descentralizado, he led Melgar, becoming the first Chilean to do it before Ramón Estay and Miguel Ángel Arrué. Despite they qualified to the final group to compete for the league title, they finally competed for staying at the top level against Atlético Grau and Juan Aurich. In addition, they faced Cienciano by first time in the top division, defeating them by 3–1, in a match later called . 

In 1974, he coached a team made up by players from Cienciano and Alfonso Ugarte what was called Selección del Sur, in a tour for Bolivia.

From 1974 to 1975, he led Unión Tumán.

In the 1975 Torneo Descentralizado, he led Cienciano, reaching the third to last place.

References

Date of birth missing
Date of death missing
Place of birth missing
Place of death missing
Chilean football managers
Chilean expatriate football managers
Coronel Bolognesi managers
FBC Melgar managers
Cienciano managers
Peruvian Primera División managers
Chilean expatriate sportspeople in Peru
Expatriate football managers in Peru